The Ocean League is a high school athletic conference in Los Angeles County, California affiliated with the CIF Southern Section.

Member schools
Beverly Hills High School
Centennial High School 
Hawthorne High School
Inglewood High School
Leuzinger High School
Morningside High School

Former members
Culver City High School
Lawndale High School
Santa Monica High School
El Segundo High School

References

CIF Southern Section leagues